Arlette Jouanna (born Arlette Galinat, 1936 – died 29 January 2022) was a French historian and academic. She was professor emerita at l’Université Paul-Valéry (Montpellier III). She was a member of the Centre de recherches interdisciplinaires en sciences humaines et sociales (CRISES). She specialised in the political and social history of sixteenth-century France, especially the history of the nobility and the French Wars of Religion.

Biography 
Jouanna was a pupil at the École normale supérieure de jeunes filles (Sèvres). She then completed a History degree in 1968 at the Sorbonne (Paris IV) where she was taught by Roland Mousnier. She was awarded her PhD in 1975 for a thesis entitled 'L'idée de race en France au XVIe siècle et au début du XVIIe'. For her entire career she taught at l'Université Paul Valéry (Montpellier III).

Awards, honours, prizes 

 In 2008 she won the Prix François Guizot for her book La Saint-Barthélemy. Les mystères d'un crime d'Etat  (The St Bartholomew's Massacre: The Mysteries of a Crime of State) (Paris, Gallimard, 2007), awarded by the Conseil général du Calvados.
 In 2013 she was awarded the Prix Chateaubriand for her book Le Pouvoir absolu : naissance de l'imaginaire politique de la royauté (Absolute Power: the Birth of the Royal Political Imaginary).
 In 2014 she was awarded the J. Russell Major Prize, an annual prize given to a historian by the American Historical Association, for her translated book The St Bartholomew’s Day Massacre: The Mysteries of a Crime of State. The prize is awarded annually for the best work in English on any aspect of French history.
 In 2018 the Prix littéraire Montaigne de Bordeaux awarded her a Special Prize for her biography of Michel de Montaigne,  Montaigne (Paris, Éditions Gallimard, 2017).

Selected publications 

 Le devoir de révolte. La noblesse française et la gestation de l'État moderne: 1559–1661. Fayard, 1989
 La Saint-Barthélemy. Les mystères d'un crime d'Etat. Gallimard, 2007
 Le pouvoir absolu : naissance de l'imaginaire politique de la royauté. Gallimard, 2013
 Bartholomew’s Day Massacre: The Mysteries of a Crime of State (trans. Joseph Bergin). Manchester University Press, 2013
 Montaigne. Gallimard, 2017

External links 
Review of Jouanna's biography of Montaigne.

Interview with Jouanna about Michel de Montaigne

Interview with Jouanna about the St Bartholomew Day's Massacre

References 

French women historians
1936 births
Living people
21st-century French historians
20th-century French historians
Academic staff of the University of Montpellier